The 2021–22 season was the 94th season in the existence of FC Sochaux-Montbéliard and the club's 10th consecutive season in the second division of French football. In addition to the domestic league, Sochaux participated in this season's edition of the Coupe de France.

Players

First-team squad

Out on loan

Transfers

In

Out

Pre-season and friendlies

Competitions

Overall record

Ligue 2

League table

Results summary

Results by round

Matches
The league fixtures were announced on 25 June 2021.

Promotion play-offs

Coupe de France

References

FC Sochaux-Montbéliard seasons
Sochaux